Legislative Assembly elections were held in Sikkim in November 1989 to elect the 32 members of the fourth Legislative Assembly.

The Sikkim Sangram Parishad won all 32 seats in the Assembly and its leader, Nar Bahadur Bhandari was made the Chief Minister for his third term.

Results

Elected members

References

State Assembly elections in Sikkim
1980s in Sikkim
Sikkim